Robert Johnstone (7 September 1929 – 22 August 2001) was a Scottish footballer, who played for Selkirk, Hibernian, Manchester City, Oldham Athletic and Witton Albion.  Johnstone also represented Scotland and the Scottish League.

Johnstone is most remembered as one of the Famous Five forward line (Smith, Johnstone, Reilly, Turnbull and Ormond) for Hibernian in the late 1940s and early 1950s. He joined Manchester City in 1955, becoming the first player to score in successive FA Cup Finals at Wembley, in 1955 and 1956. After a short return to Hibs he also played for Oldham Athletic.

He won 17 caps for Scotland.

Early life

Born on 7 September 1929 at 11 Cannon Street, Selkirk, to Elizabeth and George 'Hopey' Johnstone. Bobby was born into a footballing family in a rugby playing town. His father Hopey was described as a "hard as teak" centre-half and once declined a trial for Glasgow Rangers, preferring instead to sign for professional Border side, Peebles Rovers. Hopey who stood over six foot tall, won Border Cup medals for Selkirk in 1931 and 1932. Bobby's great uncle 'Geordie 'was in the team that won Selkirk's first ever trophy, the 1895 Border Cup.
At the age of four Johnstone contracted diphtheria which required a tracheotomy in order to stabilize his condition and was confined to his bed for around two months.
Johnstone went to school at Philiphaugh until the age of 11, then Knowepark in Selkirk where he won a prize in English. The Johnstone family moved to the nearby newly built no. 2 Linglie Road in 1943 and shortly after at the age of 14, Bobby became an apprentice painter with local firm Nichol's. It was around this time that he started to draw attention playing in the then popular five-a-side tournaments against players almost twice his age.

Career

Selkirk
With Selkirk's pre-World War II side depleted due to retirement and those like Sandy Adamson who made the Supreme Sacrifice, the club turned to the town's youth to restart football in peace time. Making a name for himself with local Parkvale Rovers and Army Cadet football was a young Bobby Johnstone. In October 1946, in front of a 1,500 crowd, a Selkirk team including Johnstone defeated Queen of the South which featured future Scottish Internationalist Billy Houliston on the Toll Field. Johnstone also featured in the side which lost out to professional Gala Fairydean in the East of Scotland Cup Final. Later in 1946, both Bobby Johnstone and Eck Piercy were signed for Hibernian, with the promise of a friendly game at Ettrick Park being the transfer fee. The deal was honoured in October 1947 in front of 2,000 spectators with Johnstone being given permission to play for Selkirk one last time.

Hibernian
Bobby Johnstone, known to his mates as 'Nicker', signed for Hibs in 1946 from Selkirk and had two spells with them. Having signed for Hibs, Johnstone received rave reviews while playing for the reserves and was given his first chance in the first team in April 1949, when they played a friendly against Nithsdale Wanderers at Sanquhar. Hibs' Famous Five forward line were given there collective debut in that game.

However, at the start of the 1949–50 season in August it was Bobby Combe in possession of the jersey. His big chance came in October after Hibs half backs got the blame for losing to Dunfermline in the League Cup semi final at Tynecastle. The entire half back line were dropped and Johnstone was given his chance with Combe moved to half back. Therefore, the Famous Five made their collective competitive debut on 15 October 1949 against Queen of the South, with Hibs winning 2–0.

Johnstone picked up Scottish League winners medals in 1951 and 1952. He also played in a Scottish League Cup final and ended league runners-up in the seasons bookending the double league win.

Johnstone was the first of Hibs' famous five to leave Hibs when he transferred in March 1955.

Manchester City

He joined Manchester City for the hefty sum of £22,000. 
Johnstone was the only one of the Famous Five to play in England. He scored in back-to-back FA Cup Finals for Manchester City, losing in 1955 to Newcastle United and winning in 1956 against Birmingham City. Johnstone was the first player to score in consecutive FA Cup Finals at Wembley. He played alongside future Hibs manager Dave Ewing in both finals.

Return to Hibs

Johnstone returned to Hibs in 1959 for £6,000. Johnstone is remembered most for his first spell with Hibs, yet he inspired them to a couple of incredible wins on his return, even though he had put on a few pounds and was a little less mobile. However, the brain had not slowed down any and his prompting enabled the team to score 10 goals at Firhill against Partick Thistle and another 11 at Broomfield against Airdrie.

Oldham Athletic

After his second spell with Hibs he went south again to join Oldham Athletic and is widely regarded as one of their greatest ever players.

Bernard Halford was assistant secretary in the early 1960s and recalled, "He transformed the club, no doubt about that. He had the crowds flocking down Sheepfoot Lane, even though Athletic had dropped into the Fourth Division. I think it was the only period in my life when I regularly told lies. On match days the phone never stopped ringing. 'Is Johnstone playing?' Bobby might have been sitting in my office with his ankle in plaster, but I had to say he was playing, otherwise the fans wouldn't have turned up. It really was as cut and dried as that."

In the summer of 1965, some 19 years after his senior career had started, Johnstone retired from playing professional football.

International
Of his seventeen international caps, probably the most memorable was scoring on his debut, a 3–2 win against England at Wembley in which Lawrie Reilly also scored. From Scotland's 22-man 1954 World Cup squad, Scotland decided to take only 13 of the 22 to the finals. Johnstone was in the 13 but withdrew through injury. Staying at home on reserve were the likes of Bobby Combe and Jimmy Binning. George Hamilton was also on reserve but travelled after Johnstone's withdrawal.

Johnstone also collected international goals against Northern Ireland, Wales, Sweden and Finland. As well as winning 17 international caps for Scotland, Johnstone also represented the Scottish League on 6 occasions. He also played for a Great Britain team against a "Rest of Europe" side in August 1955, a match played to commemorate the 75th year of the Irish Football Association.

Personal life
He was survived by his daughter Nicola and granddaughter Caroline.

Career statistics

International appearances

International goals
Scores and results list Scotland's goal tally first.

Honours
Hibernian

Scottish League First Division: 1950–51, 1951–52
Scottish League Cup (runners-up): 1950–51

Manchester City

FA Cup winner: 1956
FA Cup (runners-up): 1955

Individual

Scottish Football Hall of Fame inductee (2010)

References

External links

1929 births
2001 deaths
People from Selkirk, Scottish Borders
Association football inside forwards
Scottish footballers
Hibernian F.C. players
Manchester City F.C. players
Oldham Athletic A.F.C. players
Witton Albion F.C. players
Scotland international footballers
1954 FIFA World Cup players
Scottish Football League players
English Football League players
Scottish Football Hall of Fame inductees
People educated at Selkirk High School
Scottish Football League representative players
Scottish Junior Football Association players
Newtongrange Star F.C. players
Sportspeople from the Scottish Borders
Selkirk F.C. players
FA Cup Final players